Kullavere River (also Omedu River) is a river in Estonia in Jõgeva and Tartu County. The river is 59.1 km long and basin size is 629.3 km2. It runs into Peipus Lake.

References

Rivers of Estonia
Jõgeva County
Tartu County